Dent's vlei rat (Otomys denti) is a species of rodent in the family Muridae.
It is found in Burundi, Democratic Republic of the Congo, Malawi, Tanzania, Uganda, and Zambia.
Its natural habitats are subtropical or tropical moist montane forests, subtropical or tropical high-altitude shrubland, and subtropical or tropical high-altitude grassland.
It is threatened by habitat loss.

References

Otomys
Mammals described in 1906
Taxa named by Oldfield Thomas
Taxonomy articles created by Polbot